The Battle of Zygos Pass was a battle between the Byzantine Empire and the Pechenegs. To combat the Pecheneg revolt, Byzantine Emperor Constantine IX sent a Byzantine army under the command of Basil the Synkellos, Nikephoros Botaneiates, and the Doux of Bulgaria, to guard the Danube. Whilst marching to their station, the Pechenegs ambushed and destroyed the Byzantine army. Surviving troops, led by Nikephoros, escaped. They traveled for 12 days to Adrianople, while under constant Pecheneg attacks. Botaneiates first gained notoriety after his actions during the battle. Resulting in a promotion to magistros. As a consequence of the Byzantine defeat at this battle, Emperor Constantine IX was forced to sue for peace.

Battle 
During the Pecheneg Revolt, Byzantine Emperor Constantine IX sent Nikephoros Botaneiates, Basil the Synkellos, and the Doux of Bulgaria to guard the Danube River. While traveling through the mountains, Basil decided to not attack the Pechenegs. Basil then ordered his army to march out of the mountains. While marching out of the mountains, Basil fell into a trap laid by the Pechenegs, resulting in the destruction of the Byzantine army. Nikephoros would rescue the cavalry by ordering them into a tight formation, preventing the Pecheneg's horse archers from inflicting casualties on the Byzantines. Nikephoros withdrew and encamped his army at a nearby river bank. Byzantine scouts ensured he would never be taken by surprise. Nikephoros held out against the Pechenegs for eleven days, during which, the Pechenegs shot the Byzantine horses, forcing them to continue on foot. The Pechenegs also unsuccessfully tried to persuade the Byzantines to surrender. One Byzantine soldier offered Nikephoros a horse to escape on. However, he refused the offer. On the twelfth day, Nikephoros reached Adrianople. Once the Byzantine army reached the city, the Pechenegs fled. Because of Nikephoros' actions at the battle, emperor Constantine IX awarded Nikephoros the title of Magistros. Despite this, the battle of Zygos Pass was still a Byzantine defeat, and Constantine IX sued for peace with the Pechenegs.

References 

Zygos Pass
1050s in the Byzantine Empire
1053 in Europe
Zygos Pass
Battles involving the Pechenegs